Ieuan Rhys (born 24 December 1961) is a Welsh actor. His television work has included thirteen years in the BBC Cymru soap opera Pobol y Cwm, Seargent Tom Swann in the last series of A Mind to Kill (for Fiction Factory/Channel 5) and six series of the Welsh-language version of Mr & Mrs – Sion a Sian for HTV. For the last four series he portrayed Eurig Bell, the "not to be messed with" Deputy Headmaster in S4C's Gwaith/Cartref.

Biography

Early life 
Ieuan Rhys was born Ieuan Rhys Evans in the village of Trecynon, near Aberdare, South Wales on 24 December 1961. He attended Ysgol Gynradd Gymraeg Aberdar primary school, and Ysgol Gyfun Rhydfelen secondary school near Pontypridd, both Welsh language schools. His father, Gethin Evans, was a music teacher at the nearby comprehensive school.

Theatre
Rhys trained as an actor at The Royal Welsh College of Music & Drama in Cardiff. His theatre work has included working for the National Theatre in London playing the part of Bruce in People by Alan Bennett and touring major theatres in England (July – November 2013), Dobchinsky in UK tour of The Government Inspector for Communicado Theatre Company, A Provincial Life National Theatre Wales – an adaptation by Peter Gill of a short story by Chekhov, Elwyn – (Elling) – directed by Michael Bogdanov, Whose Coat Is That Jacket? – touring Wales alongside Hollyoaks star Terri Dwyer.

Other Theatre credits also include a UK tour as The Spruiker in The Thorn Birds – A Musical, Montague in Michael Bogdanov's production of Romeo and Juliet, Alfred Doolittle in My Fair Lady at Aberystwyth Arts Centre (2008), Burberry for Sherman Cymru, Cocks & Tales for Cwmni 3D, Pennington in The Hired Man (at The Torch Theatre, Milford Haven), The Servant of Two Masters, Contender,  A Christmas Carol with Ron Moody as Scrooge, A Child's Christmas in Wales, Fiddler on the Roof at Aberystwyth Arts Centre (2006) Hamlet, Amazing Grace – The Musical, Cymbeline, The Merchant of Venice, Twelfth Night (for Wales Theatre Company), The Merry Wives of Windsor, The Winter's Tale, (at The Ludlow Festival, 2002–04), the award-winning production of Amdani (Sgript Cymru), Cwm Glo (Theatr Gwynedd),Seithenyn A'r Twrw Tanllyd Tanddwr (Canol Y Ffordd), Oliver! at Aberystwyth Arts Centre. In September 2011, he appeared in Bred in Heaven for Frapetsus Theatre Company, written by Jack Llewellen and directed by Michael Bogdanov. The play, a follow-up to the popular 1978 BBC Wales comedy drama Grand Slam, is described as "a two-hour romp filled with laughs, double meanings and camp humour."

He has also appeared in many pantomimes including Snow White at The Coliseum, Aberdare and tours with Stan Stennett in Cinderella and Owen Money in three productions of Aladdin, Jack and the Beanstalk and Cinderella (directed by Michael Bogdanov). He has played Dame twice for the Welsh-language panto's Hansel & Gretel and Aladdin with Martyn Geraint. Christmas 2012, Rhys appeared in Sleeping Beauty at the New Marlowe Theatre in Canterbury with Gareth Gates and Toyah Willcox and for the 2013 Season he appeared alongside Stephen Mulhern in Cinderella at The Hawth Theatre Crawley and in 2014–15, he played King Dafydd in The Octagon Theatre, Yeovill's Jack & The Beanstalk. In 2015–16, he appeared alongside Coronation Street'''s Chris Gascoyne in Aladdin at The Lyceum Theatre in Sheffield. In the 2017–18, pantomime season he appeared in Sleeping Beauty at the Grove Theatre, Dunstable, as King Cuthbert, alongside, Sally Lindsay and John Partridge. 2018–19 saw Ieuan with CBeebies' Katrina Bryan and Sam Rabone in Dick whittington at the Garrick Theatre, Lichfield and for the 2019–20 season he played dame for the first time in England at Northwich Memorial Court in Peter Pan alongside John Altman from EastEnders and Katie McGlynn from Coronation Street.

Television
Rhys's television work has included thirteen years in the role of Seargent Glyn James in the BBC Cymru soap opera Pobol y Cwm, Seargent Tom Swann in the last series of A Mind to Kill (for Fiction Factory/Channel 5) and six series of the Welsh-language version of Mr & Mrs – Sion a Sian for HTV.

Other TV work include Councilman De'Rossi in DaVinci's Demons (Season 3), Crabtree in Doctor Who (The Idiot's Lantern) BBC Wales, High Hopes BBC Wales,Rocket Man (Coastal/BBC), Diamond Geezer with David Jason (Yorkshire TV), Bomber (Zenith TV), Rhinoceros (Granada Television), Jara (HTV), Tracey Beaker – The Movie, Of Me (BBC), Mortimer's Law (BBC) Nice Girl (BBC – Screen 2), The Welsh In, Shakespeare (BBC), Y Delyn, Cameo (Opus TV), Dihirod Dyfed, Llafur Cariad (Taliseyn),Rough Justice (BBC),Crimewatch: Wanted (BBC),Aladdin (BBC) and the first episode of Bowen A'i Bartner (BBC). Cowbois Ac Injans (Opus TV), Y Pris (Fiction Factory), Ar Y Tracs with Ruth Jones (Tidy Productions), and as Arthur in Stella (Sky 1). He played Enzo in the daytime drama series Pitching In alongside Larry Lamb and Hayley Mills (BBC/LA Productions) and Dorien in S4C's popular 'whodunnit' drama series 35 Awr (Boom Cymru)

Film
His film work includes Masterpiece (Burn Hand Films), Goldfish in a Blender and What? (Screengems), Ringfinger (Fiction Factory), Darklands (Lluniau Lliw) and the Hugh Grant film The Englishman Who Went Up a Hill But Came Down a Mountain.Other
As well as his autobiography Allet Ti Beswch! he has written four children's books published by 'Y Lolfa' – Hwyl a Joio, Joio Mas Draw, Jyst Joio and Hwyl a Hafoc. He has also recorded two albums on the Flach label – Ni Allwn Droi Yn Ol – (There's No Turning Back) and Y Diddanwr – (The Entertainer). He also wrote and performed on the Pobol y Cwm charity single "Ar Y Bla'n" – also on the Fflach label.

He can also be seen as Master of Ceremonies at Cardiff Castle's Welsh Banquets and has also presented many radio shows including the Welsh language radio show Showbusnesan for BBC Radio Cymru.

He has filmed an eight part Internet comedy series for Pitcairn Films called Bernard & Knives where he plays title character – Bernard. The whole series can now be viewed on YouTube.

Current activities
During the Pandemic Period of 2020 Rhys has been busy producing a mini series for RCT Theatres on YouTube called Phyl & Ieu On... with Phyl Harries and also a popular podcast called  Ystafell Werdd Ieuan Rhys (Ieuan Rhys' Green Room)
Personal life
Rhys lives in Cardiff and has two sons Cai and Llew.

References

Bibliography

External links
ieuanrhys.com
Ieuan Rhys at National Theatre.org

 Bernard & Knives'' – Episode 1
Gwaith Cartref 

Living people
Welsh male television actors
Welsh-speaking actors
Alumni of the Royal Welsh College of Music & Drama
1961 births
Place of birth missing (living people)